National Renewal (RN) is a liberal conservative political party in Chile. It is a member of Chile Vamos, a center-right to right-wing coalition. Sebastián Piñera, the former President of Chile, is a member of the party.

History
National Renewal was formed on 29 April 1987 when three rightist organizations – the National Union Movement (Movimiento de Unión Nacional, MUN), the National Labour Front (Frente Nacional del Trabajo, FNT), and the Independent Democratic Union Movement (Movimiento Unión Demócrata Independiente, UDI) – joined in preparation for the 1988 Plebiscite that would determine the continuity or not of rule of Augusto Pinochet who had been in power since the coup of 1973. The UDI soon broke away to run as a separate party due to its strong support for the plebiscite and a Pinochet candidacy, while the remaining National Renewal party indicated its preference for an open election or a candidate other than Pinochet. However, once Pinochet was proclaimed candidate, the overwhelming majority of National Renewal supported him.

The party was founded on 29 April with 351 founding members. In this way, National Renewal was the first political party to form in Chile after the lifting on the ban of political parties that had been established after the coup; by December of that year, 61,167 members, led by Andrés Allamand, had joined. The principal idea that the party proclaimed was to generate an environment of calm during the return of democracy.

The party supported UDI candidate Joaquín Lavín as the sole Alliance candidate in the 1999/2000 presidential elections, who went on to obtain 47.5% of the votes in the first round, but was subsequently defeated in the second round by Ricardo Lagos.

During early 2005, the party initially supported Lavín to again run as the sole candidate of the Alliance in the presidential election of that year. However, in face of Lavín's declining opinion poll numbers, Sebastián Piñera announced his candidacy as the National Renewal candidate thus ensuring that the Alliance have two candidates for the election. In the first round on 11 December, Piñera obtained 25.4% of the vote, which was enough to send him to the run-off on 15 January 2006 with Michelle Bachelet. With 46.5% of the vote, Piñera was defeated by Bachelet.

In the legislative elections, also on 11 December 2005, the party won, as part of the Alliance for Chile, 20 out of 120 seats in the Chamber of Deputies and currently holds 7 out of 38 seats in the Senate.

In the parliamentary elections, also on 13 December 2009, the party gains, as part of the Coalition for Change, 18 out of 120 seats in the Chamber of Deputies of Chile and currently has 8 out of 38 seats in the Senate of Chile.

In the 2010 presidential election, Sebastián Piñera was elected president of Chile.

In 2013, Andrés Allamand was presidential precandidate for primary elections, the National Renewal party supported the presidential candidacy of Evelyn Matthei for the presidential election, that lost in second round with the 37% of the votes.

In January 2014, three deputies (Karla Rubilar, Pedro Browne and Joaquín Godoy) and one senator (Lily Pérez) resigned to membership in the party and launched a political movement called "Amplitude" (Amplitud), that aimed to be a new political party inside the Alliance. In the internal elections of 2014 the party, the deputy Cristián Monckeberg was elected president of the party. On 2 August 2014, National Renewal debuts its new logo with a blue and red star gradient colours. In August 2014 the deputy Gaspar Rivas left the party.

On 22 November 2014, on a Doctrinal Council held in Pucón, National Renewal drafted a new statement of principles where they were eliminated references to the coup d'état of 11 September 1973.

On 4 October 2015, National Renewal formed with the Independent Democratic Union (UDI), Political Evolution (Evópoli) and the Independent Regionalist Party (PRI) the new centre-right coalition called Chile Vamos.

In July 2016, the Senator of National Renewal Manuel José Ossandón left the party to form his presidential candidacy in 2017. The National Renewal party, in 2017, accorded support the presidential candidacy of Sebastián Piñera within UDI and PRI to primary elections of the centre-right coalition Chile Vamos.

In the parliamentary elections of 2017, National Renewal obtained 36 seats in the Chamber of Deputies with 17.80% of the votes and 8 seats in the Senate with 20.98% of the votes, thus becoming the most voted party in these elections and displacing its coalition partner, the Independent Democratic Union.

On 11 March 2018, for the second government of Sebastián Piñera, National Renewal has 5 Ministers, 8 Undersecretaries, 5 regional Intendants and 24 provincial Governors.

Presidents of National Renewal

National Renewal has nine party presidents in its history:

 Ricardo Rivadeneira (1987)
 Sergio Onofre Jarpa (1987–1990)
 Andrés Allamand (1990–1997)
 Alberto Espina (1997–1999)
 Alberto Cardemil (1999–2001)
 Sebastián Piñera (2001–2004)
 Sergio Diez (2004–2006)
 Carlos Larraín (2006–2014)
 Cristián Monckeberg (2014–2018)
 Mario Desbordes (2018–2021)
 Francisco Chahuán (2021–)

Electoral history

Presidential elections
The following is a list of the presidential candidates supported by the National Renewal. (Information gathered from the Archive of Chilean Elections).

Congress election

Party logos

See also
 Alliance (Chile)
 Chile Vamos
 Independent Democratic Union
 Sergio Onofre Jarpa
 Andrés Allamand
 Sebastián Piñera
 Carlos Larraín
 Manuel José Ossandón

References

External links

National Renewal 
National Renewal Youth 

1987 establishments in Chile
Conservative parties in Chile
International Democrat Union member parties
Liberal conservative parties
Neoliberal parties
Political parties established in 1987
Political parties in Chile